Lauma Skride (born 20 March 1982) in Riga is a Latvian pianist.

Life 
Lauma's father, Arnolds Skride, conducts a musical ensemble after ten years as a violinist at the Dailes Theatre. He is the adopted son of the painter . Lauma is the youngest of three sisters, all three of whom have devoted themselves to music. She began studying the piano at the age of 5 and then entered the  Jāzeps Vītols Latvian Academy of Music. She also studied at the Hamburg Conservatory with Professor Volker Banfield.

In June 1998, Skride took part in the 9th edition of the Eurovision Young Musicians in Vienna.

She became known to a wider audience through performances as a duo with her sister Baiba, with whom she also released an album in March 2007 with works by Franz Schubert, Ludwig van Beethoven and Maurice Ravel. Her solo debut album with recordings of Fanny Mendelssohn-Hensel was already released in January 2007. Since then, she has increasingly established herself as a soloist. In 2009, for example, she made her debut with the hr-Sinfonieorchester and has appeared as a guest with orchestras such as the Hamburger Symphoniker and the Staatsphilharmonie Nürnberg.

Skride performs on stages all over the world and her duo concerts with her sister Baiba Skride (violinist) helped her to make herself known. She founded with her and the violist Lise Berthaud and the cellist Harriet Krijgh the Skride Piano Quartet.

Recording 
 2007 Lauma Skride : Mendelssohn-Hensel - The Year
 2007 Baiba & Lauma Skride : The Duo Sessions - Beethoven, Schubert, Ravel.
 2022 Lauma Skride & Brandenburger Symphoniker - Beethoven, Pianoconcerto no.4, variationen WoO 80.

References

External links 
 
 

Latvian classical pianists
Women classical pianists
Echo (music award) winners
1982 births
Living people
Musicians from Riga
Eurovision Young Musicians Finalists